Asthenopsis is an extinct genus from a well-known class of fossil marine arthropods, the trilobites. It lived during the Cambrian Period, which lasted from approximately 542 to 488 million years ago.

References

Cambrian trilobites of Australia
Ptychopariida genera
Fossil taxa described in 1939
Ptychopariidae

Cambrian genus extinctions